The 2014–15 Skeleton World Cup was a multi-race tournament over a season for skeleton. The season started on 12 December 2014 in Lake Placid, New York, United States, and ended on 15 February 2015 in Sochi, Russia. The World Cup is organised by the FIBT who also runs World Cups and Championships in bobsleigh. The season was sponsored by Viessmann.

Calendar 
Below is the schedule of the 2014–15 season

Results

Men

Women

Standings

Men

Women

References

External links 
 FIBT

Skeleton World Cup
2014 in skeleton
2015 in skeleton